The Minister for European Affairs is one of the Finnish Government's ministerial positions.

The Rinne Cabinet's incumbent Minister for European Affairs is Tytti Tuppurainen of the Social Democratic Party.

References 

Lists of government ministers of Finland